Las Américas may refer to:

 Las Américas International Airport, an airport in Punta Caucedo, Santo Domingo
 Las Américas Newcomer School, an alternative middle school in Houston, Texas
 Playa de las Américas, a holiday resort in Tenerife, Spain
 Las Américas, a neighborhood in Ecatepec de Morelos
 Las Américas metro station, Valparaíso, Chile
 Las Américas (Mexibús, Line 1), a BRT station in Ecatepec, State of Mexico
 Las Américas (Mexibús, Line 2), a BRT station in Ecatepec, State of Mexico
 Las Américas (Mexico City Metrobús), a BRT station in Mexico City